The fifth and final season of Tubridy Tonight commenced airing on 27 September 2008 and completed broadcasting on 30 May 2009. The series, hosted by Ryan Tubridy, aired on RTÉ One on Saturdays nights following the RTÉ News: Nine O'Clock. At the end of this series, Tubridy took over from Pat Kenny as host of The Late Late Show on Friday nights on the same channel.

Musical guests throughout the series included Fall Out Boy, The Saturdays, Sugababes, Gabriella Cilmi, Take That, The Script, Lady GaGa, Petula Clark, Bell X1, The Blizzards, Dolores O'Riordan, Boyzone, Melody Gardot and Spandau Ballet.

This series featured a new set, retaining its traditional library theme but updated for the 21st century. The opening episode featured Aidan and Marian Quinn, who spoke of their film 32A, and actresses Charlene McKenna and Shelley Conn who spoke of their parts in Raw. Don Baker also spoke of his time on Fáilte Towers, whilst there were comedic and musical performances from Oliver Callan and Fujiya & Miyagi respectively.

The second episode featured the Seoige sisters, Gráinne and Síle, who were about to launch their new television series, Seoige. Also appearing were actress Anna Faris to talk about her film, The House Bunny, and Peaches Geldof who was quizzed on how her father Bob reacted to her Las Vegas wedding. The third episode featured the three times Eurovision winner Johnny Logan, author Jackie Collins, comedian Paddy Courtney, and model and wife of Claudine Palmer, Robbie Keane. Tubridy was said to be hoping that Collins would "spill the beans on the excesses of Tinseltown's glory days".

Guests on the fourth episode included At Your Service hoteliers Francis and John Brennan and actor Michael Fassbender who Tubridy described as "a really talented Irish actor and his performance in the new Bobby Sands film Hunger is fantastic, there are definitely big things in store for him". Before his appearance on the fifth episode, Tubridy described Mike Murphy as "one of my all-time heroes" and "an Irish broadcasting legend". Tubridy also described himself as a fan of the Eoin Colfer novel series, Artemis Fowl, and Sugababes song "Girls" before the writer and band both appeared on episode six.

The seventh episode featured director Richard Attenborough, Desperate Housewives''' actor Dougray Scott and Irish television personalities Zig and Zag, whose last television appearance was on 1990s chat show Kenny Live and who referred to Tubridy as "Twiggery" throughout. In the ninth episode, golfer Pádraig Harrington granted his first major television interview since winning both the year's British Open and PGA Championship. Also appearing in this edition were television presenters Eamonn Holmes and Ruth Langsford, as well as actor John Slattery from Mad Men, Desperate Housewives, Sex & the City and Will & Grace. Comedian Dara Ó Briain, rugby union players Anthony Foley and Peter Stringer and actor Aiden Gillen (The Wire) featured in the tenth episode.

Stylist Gok Wan was interviewed in the eleventh episode, which also featured reformed British boyband Take That - the show was inundated with audience ticket requests by fans of the band when it was announced they would be appearing. The Script flew in especially to appear on the thirteenth episode.

The fifteenth episode was also the first of 2009 and featured Tom Chambers, Craig Revel Horwood and Bruno Tonioli from the BBC's Strictly Come Dancing and Mark Hamilton from RTÉ's How Long Will You Live? series. Actor Roger Moore was a guest on the sixteenth edition of the fifth series, with Tubridy commenting beforehand that he was "a huge Bond fan and... ...loved all his 007 performances". Moore spoke about his acting career as well as his time spent as an ambassador with UNICEF, whilst fellow guest Maura Derrane spoke of her role presenting the TG4 television series Feirme Factor. The eighteenth edition featured actor William Shatner who discussed his roles on Star Trek and Boston Legal, and La Toya Jackson who spoke of her time spent on the UK television series Big Brother.

The nineteenth episode featured Teens in the Wild presenter David Coleman, singer Petula Clark and Mark Pollock, the first blind man to reach the South Pole. Tubridy commented on his love of 1960s music beforehand, citing Clark's song "Downtown" as one of his favourite songs from that decade. Tubridy interviewed Northern Irish actors Liam Neeson and James Nesbitt about their film, Five Minutes of Heaven, in the twentieth episode of the season, describing them as " two of our [Ireland's] finest acting exports". Neeson appeared on the show less than a month before the death of his wife Natasha Richardson in a skiing accident, which he did not speak of for over two months. Also interviewed in that episode were rugby union television analysts George Hook and Brent Pope, with music provided by Bell X1. Guests on the twenty-first episode were ER actress Maura Tierney, boxer Bernard Dunne and music from The Blizzards.

The twenty-second episode featured The Clinic actress Amy Huberman, celebrity chef Kevin Dundon, comedian Paddy Courtney, Dara Ó Cinnéide and Aoibhinn Ní Shúilleabháin, as well as George Karellas, who was campaigning to win a job as caretaker of a tropical island near Australia. Guests on the twenty-third episode included jockey Ruby Walsh and veteran broadcaster David Attenborough, who Tubridy described as "one of my all time heroes", saying he had grown up watching his nature programmes. Tubridy spoke of his love for Welsh actor Michael Sheen before he appeared on the twenty-fourth episode of the season to discuss The Damned United. George Lee also appeared to discuss his documentary How We Blew the Boom and winners of The All Ireland Talent Show, the Mulkerrin Brothers, featured alongside the winning judge, Daithí Ó Sé.

Boxer Bernard Dunne returned to the show in the twenty-fifth episode after becoming a World Champion. Also guests on this show were TV presenter Holly Willoughby, who spoke of her pregnancy and Dancing on Ice, and comedian Brendan O'Carroll who spoke about his stage show, For the Love of Mrs Brown, with music provided by singer Brian Kennedy. Guests on the twenty-sixth edition were comedian Pat Shortt, television presenter Lorraine Keane and journalist and author Paul Howard, whose Ross O'Carroll-Kelly series Tubridy is a fan of. Keane was appearing less than three weeks before she parted company with TV3 and her Xposé show.

The twenty-eighth episode featured Erin O'Connor and model agent Ellis, who were promoting their television series The Model Agent, whilst a panel of Adam Brophy, Sinéad Moriarty and Dermot Whelan discussed parenthood. Former English association footballer Paul Gascoigne appeared on the twenty-ninth edition of the season to discuss the Channel 4 documentary Saving Gazza,  with other guests being the celebrity chef Richard Corrigan, who was promoting his television series Corrigan's City Farm and musician Dolores O'Riordan who discussed her latest album. The thirtieth episode featured Stephen Fry ("always interesting" - Tubridy), boy band Boyzone ("great craic"), British television presenter Fern Britton ("as much of a giggle on our show as she is on This Morning") and Irish comedy duo Jason Byrne and PJ Gallagher ("pure entertainment").Celebrity Bainisteoir season 2 finalists Derek Davis and Katherine Lynch, actor Colm Meaney, Robson Green and Gift Grub's Mario Rosenstock were guests on the thirty-first episode,with music provided by jazz singer Melody Gardot. Tubridy was joined by Spandau Ballet, Adam Carroll and television presenting couple, Marty Whelan and Mary Kennedy, on the thirty-second edition of the season. Tubridy said he was "delighted" that Spandau Ballet agreed to appear with "80s nostalgia now [being] bigger than ever". The final episode saw the return of one of the more memorable Tubridy Tonight'' guests, David Hasselhoff. RTÉ later reported viewing figures of 854,000, with 518,000 tuning in at one peak point.

Note: There were no shows on 14 February 2009 and 16 May 2009 due to the Irish Film and Television Awards (IFTAs) and the Eurovision Song Contest respectively.

References

2008 Irish television seasons
2009 Irish television seasons